Episema can mean:

Episema (moth), a genus of moths in the family Noctuidae
an interpretative mark in the musical notation of Gregorian chant
the plural of episemon, a word for a symbolic badge or for a numeral sign